(The) Last Stop may refer to:

 In transportation, a term for terminus
 Last Stop (1935 film), a 1935 German romantic comedy film directed by E. W. Emo
 The Last Stop (film), a 2012 Brazilian-Lebanese drama film
 "The Last Stop" (song), a 1998 song by the Dave Matthews Band
 Last Stop (video game), a 2021 video game developed by Variable State